Air Vice Marshal Prishantha De Silva, USP, psc, SLAF is the former Director Inspection and Safety, and also former director of Aeronautical Engineering Sri Lanka Air Force.

He was educated at Nalanda College Colombo and joined the Sri Lanka Air Force an officer cadet.

He is a Fellow of the Institution of Engineers, Sri Lanka and is a member of the Royal Aeronautical Society.

References

 SL in major arms deal with China
 MiG deal crash lands on Defence Ministry
 Heavy casualties as war intensifies

Living people
Sri Lanka Air Force air vice-marshals
Sinhalese military personnel
Sinhalese engineers
Alumni of Nalanda College, Colombo
Year of birth missing (living people)